Antioch is a station on Metra's North Central Service in Antioch, Illinois. In Metra's zone-based fare system, Antioch is in zone J. As of 2018, Antioch is the 165th busiest of Metra's 236 non-downtown stations, with an average of 192 weekday boardings. The Illinois/Wisconsin border is just to the north of the station.

Antioch is the northern terminus of the North Central Service.

As of December 12, 2022, Antioch is served by all 14 trains (seven in each direction) on weekdays, with all trains originating and terminating here.

Bus connections
Western Kenosha County Transit - Route 2

References

External links

2001 Photo of Station (DigitalPast.org)
Station House from Google Maps Street View

Metra stations in Illinois
Antioch, Illinois
Railway stations in Lake County, Illinois
Railway stations in the United States opened in 1996
Former Soo Line stations